Thorns is a 2008 studio album by American rapper Beans, released on Adored and Exploited. It includes contributions from Dabrye and Holy Fuck.

Critical reception
Steve Glencross of The List gave the album 4 stars out of 5 and described it as "a hard-hitting and personal work." Roque Strew of Pitchfork gave the album a 7.5 out of 10, saying, "Thorns proves that Beans can smoothly career between maximalism and minimalism when he's in his element, building on the sci-fi slam poetry heritage he created with High Priest, M. Sayyid, and Earl Blaize."

Track listing

References

External links
 

2008 albums
Beans (rapper) albums